The Adversarial Tactics, Techniques, and Common Knowledge or MITRE ATT&CK is a guideline for classifying and describing cyberattacks and intrusions. It was created by the Mitre Corporation and released in 2013.

The framework consists of 14 tactics categories consisting of "technical objectives" of an adversary. Examples include privilege escalation and command and control. These categories are then broken down further into specific techniques and sub-techniques.

The framework is an alternative to the Cyber Kill Chain developed by Lockheed Martin.

References

External links
 MITRE ATT&CK

Classification systems
Computer standards
Mitre Corporation